Nicole Stephanie Danielle Lyn (born February 24, 1978) is a Canadian television actress. She is best known for her roles as Susan Kushner in Ramona and Emily Roberts on the Canadian teen comedy series Student Bodies.

Early life
Lyn was born in Brampton, Ontario, to Cheryl Gabay, a Jamaican woman of Afro-Jamaican descent, and Peter Lyn, who is Chinese-Jamaican. She grew up in the Toronto area. As a child, Nicole danced in the National Ballet School's Junior Dance division, and was also a member of the Canadian Children's Opera Chorus. Nicole entered show business when she was offered a spot on a Jordache billboard after accompanying her aunt, a model, to her audition.

Career
She auditioned for and was admitted to Claude Watson School for the Arts at age 10. She worked filming commercials, guest starring roles, and had co-starring role on the Canadian kid-com Eric's World (1991). She later auditioned for and attended Cardinal Carter Academy for the Arts in Toronto from grade 7 - 9, where she was a dance major.

She later moved to Jamaica (where her father resides) in 10th grade and attended Belair High School in Mandeville.

One of her first auditions upon returning to Canada was for the YTV teen sitcom Student Bodies (1997), on which she landed a lead role alongside Jamie Elman, Katie Emme McIninch, Ross Hull, Jennifer Finnigan, and Mark Taylor.

Lyn made her acting debut in the television series Ramona.

She has made television guest appearances on The Kids in the Hall, Are You Afraid of the Dark?, Relic Hunter, Andy Richter Controls the Universe, My Secret Identity, The West Wing, Half & Half, and Psych. She was a series regular in the Canadian television shows Eric's World and Student Bodies.

Lyn also appeared in the television film, "The Feast Of All Saints" based on an Anne Rice novel of the same name.

Lyn has appeared in television films such as On Thin Ice: The Tai Babilonia Story and Dying To Dance, and appeared in the feature film Deliver Us From Eva.

Lyn also DJs under the name "Ms. Nix" and serves as an announcer on MTV2's Hip Hop Squares.

Personal life
On July 10, 2004, Lyn married Dulé Hill, an actor on The West Wing and Psych.  On November 28, 2012, after eight years of marriage, Hill filed for divorce from Lyn, citing irreconcilable differences.

In 2014, she began a relationship with Chad Easterling. She gave birth to her son, Crosby Sparrow Easterling, on June 13, 2018.

References

External links
 

1978 births
Canadian actresses of Chinese descent
Canadian people of Jamaican descent
Actresses from Ontario
Black Canadian actresses
Canadian expatriate actresses in the United States
Canadian television actresses
People from Brampton
Living people
20th-century Canadian actresses
21st-century Canadian actresses
Game show announcers